Rabbi Dr. Bernard Drachman (June 27, 1861, in New York City – March 12, 1945 in New York City) was a leader of Orthodox Judaism in the United States at the beginning of the twentieth century.

Biography
Drachman was born to parents who were immigrants from Galicia and Bavaria. After studying in a Hebrew preparatory school, Drachman earned a B.A. from Columbia College. He earned a scholarship at the Jewish Theological Seminary of Breslau where he received his rabbinic ordination. He also earned a PhD from the University of Heidelberg.

In 1890, Drachman began serving as rabbi in the Park East Synagogue, where he led for the next fifty-five years. Drachman was president of the Orthodox Union and  professor at the Jewish Theological Seminary.

He translated Samson Raphael Hirsch's  The Nineteen Letters of Ben Uziel into English.

This was ironic as the works of Zecharias Frankel of Breslau, a man Drachman considered an important Orthodox leader had been condemned by Hirsch as heretical. Historically, Frankel is considered the founder or at least a forerunner of Conservative Judaism.

References
Goldman, Yosef. Hebrew Printing in America, 1735-1926, A History and Annotated Bibliography (YGBooks 2006). 
Levine, Yitzchak. A Forgotten Champion of American Orthodoxy. Accessed July 21, 2007.

External links

 
 

1861 births
1945 deaths
Burials at Mount Zion Cemetery (New York City)
Columbia College (New York) alumni
German–English translators
Heidelberg University alumni
Jewish Theological Seminary of America people
Orthodox rabbis from New York City
American people of German-Jewish descent
20th-century American rabbis